Most words of African origin used in English are nouns describing animals, plants, or cultural practices that have their origins in Africa (mostly sub-Saharan African; Arabic words not included unless another African language is an intermediary). The following list includes some examples.

Adinkra –  from Akan, visual symbols that represent concepts or aphorisms. Adopted in theoretical physics for graphical representation of supersymmetric algebras.
Andriana – from Malagasy, aristocratic noble class of the Kingdom of Madagascar
apartheid – from Afrikaans, "separateness"
Aṣẹ - from Yoruba, "I affirm" or "make it happen" 
ammonia – from the Egyptian language in reference to the god Amun
Bantu - from Bantu languages, "people"
babalawo – from Yoruba, priest of traditional Yoruba religion
banana – adopted from Wolof via Spanish or Portuguese
banjo – from Mandinka bangoe, which refers to the Akonting
basenji – breed of dog from Central Africa – Congo, Central African Republic etc.
boma – from Swahili
bongo – West African 
buckra – "white man or person", from Efik and Ibibio mbakara 
Buharism - Political philosophy of Nigerian president Muhammadu Buhari, especially during his rule as a military dictator.
bwana – from Swahili, meaning "husband, important person or safari leader"
chigger – possibly from Wolof and/or Yoruba jiga "insect"
chimpanzee – loaned in the 18th century from a Bantu language, possibly Kivili ci-mpenzi.
chimurenga – from Shona, "revolution" or "liberation"
cola – from West African languages (Temne kola, Mandinka kolo)
dengue – possibly from Swahili dinga
djembe – from West African languages
ebony – from Ancient Egyptian hebeni
fanimorous – from Yoruba "fani mọ́ra" meaning "to attract people to you"
gerenuk – from Somali. A long-necked antelope in Eastern Africa (Kenya, Somalia, Tanzania, Ethiopia and Djibouti)
gnu – from Khoisan !nu through Khoikhoi i-ngu and Dutch gnoe
goober – possibly from Bantu (Kikongo)
gumbo – from Bantu Kongo languages ngombo meaning "okra"
hakuna matata – from Swahili, "no trouble" or "no worries"
impala – from Zulu im-pala
impi – from Zulu language meaning "war, battle or a regiment"
indaba – from Xhosa or Zulu languages – "stories" or "news" typically conflated with "meeting" (often used in South African English)
jazz – possibly from Central African languages (Kongo) From the word jizzi”.
jenga – from the Swahili verb kujenga meaning "to build".
jive – possibly from Wolof jevjuke, jukebox – possibly from Wolof and Bambara  through Gullah
jumbo – from Swahili (jambo "hello" or from Kongo nzamba "elephant")
kalimba
Kwanzaa – a recent coinage (Maulana Karenga 1965) for the name of an African American holiday, abstracted from the Swahili phrase matunda ya kwanza, meaning "first fruits [of the harvest]"
kwashiorkor – from Ga language, coastal Ghana, meaning "swollen stomach"
Kijiji  – from Swahili for "village", "hamlet" or "small town" 
lapa – from Sotho languages – '"enclosure" or "barbecue area" (often used in South African English)
macaque – from Bantu makaku through Portuguese and French
mamba – from Zulu or Swahili mambamarimba – from Bantu (Kongo languages)
marímbula – plucked musical instrument (lamellophone) of the Caribbean islands
merengue (dance) – possibly from Fulani  meaning "to shake or quiver"
Mobutism – state ideology of Mobutu Sese Seko, the dictator of Zaire (now Democratic Republic of the Congo)
mojo – from Kongo  Moyoo "medicine man" through Louisiana Creole French or Gullah
mumbo jumbo – from Mandingo
mtepe – from Swahili, "boat"
mzungu – from Bantu languages, "wanderer"
nitrogen – from the Egyptian language. The salt natron, transliterated as nṯrj.
obeah – from West African (Efik ubio, Twi ebayifo)
okapi – from a language in the Congo
okra – from Igbo ókùrùorisha – from Yoruba, "deity"
Osu – from Igbo,  traditional caste system
oyinbo – from Yoruba, "skinless" or "peeled skin"
safari – from Swahili travel, ultimately from Arabic
sambo – Fula sambo meaning "uncle"
sangoma – from Zulu – "traditional healer" (often used in South African English)
shea – A tree and the oil Shea butter which comes from its seeds, comes from its name in Bambara
tango – probably from Ibibio 
tilapia – possibly a Latinization of "tlhapi", the Tswana word for "fish"
tsetse – from a Bantu language (Tswana tsetse, Luhya )
ubuntu – Nguni term for "mankind, humanity", in South Africa since the 1980s also used capitalized, Ubuntu, as the name of a philosophy or ideology of "human kindness" or "humanism"
uhuru – from Swahili, "freedom".
Ujamaa – from Swahili, "fraternity". Socialist policies of Tanzanian president Julius Nyerere.
vodou – from West African languages (Ewe and Fon vodu "spirit")
vuvuzela – musical instrument, name of Zulu or Nguni origin
yam – West African (Fula nyami, Twi anyinam)
zebra – of unknown origin, recorded since c. 1600, from Portuguese ‘ezebro’, used of an Iberian animal, in turn possibly ultimately from Latin ‘equiferus’, but a Congolese language, or alternatively Amharic have been put forward as possible origins
zimbabwe – from Shona, "house of stones" or "venerated houses"
zombie – likely from West African (compare Kikongo zumbi "fetish", but alternatively derived from Spanish sombra'' "shade, ghost"

References

English language
African